Oleg Zemlyakov (born 7 July 1993) is a Kazakhstani professional racing cyclist. He rode in the men's team time trial at the 2015 UCI Road World Championships.

He was crowned as the champion of the 2016 Tour de Filipinas individual general classification after 4 stages; He finished first in the race with a time of 17 hours, 36 minutes and 52 seconds to claim the yellow jersey.

Major results

2014
 2nd  Road race, Asian Under-23 Road Championships
 2nd Time trial, National Road Championships
2015
 1st  Road race, National Road Championships
 2nd Overall Tour of Szeklerland
 2nd Overall Tour of Bulgaria
1st  Young rider classification
 3rd Grand Prix des Marbriers
 4th Time trial, Asian Under-23 Road Championships
 5th Overall Tour de Filipinas
1st  Young rider classification
 6th Overall Okolo Slovenska
1st  Young rider classification
 6th Trofeo Internazionale Bastianelli
 7th Overall Tour of Thailand
 7th Overall Grand Prix of Adygeya
 8th Overall Tour of Black Sea
1st  Young rider classification
2016
 1st  Overall Tour de Filipinas
1st Stage 2

References

External links

 
 

1993 births
Living people
Kazakhstani male cyclists
People from Petropavl
Kazakhstani people of Russian descent
20th-century Kazakhstani people
21st-century Kazakhstani people